Lehigh County Historical Society is a nonprofit organization, founded in 1904, dedicated to collecting, preserving, and exhibiting the history of Lehigh County, Pennsylvania and the Lehigh Valley region of eastern Pennsylvania.  The Historical Society and Lehigh Valley Heritage Museum are located at 432 West Walnut Street in Allentown.

Lehigh Valley Heritage Museum 

Recent exhibits have included exhibits on General Harry C. Trexler, Native Americans, and American Presidents. The Museum maintains an exhibit on the Lehigh Valley and an extensive collection of local and regional historical materials with more than 30,000 historical artifacts in its collection.

Library and archive 

The Lehigh County Historical Society's library, the Scott Andrew Trexler II Research Library and Archive, houses 200,000 vintage photographs and nearly three million historical documents. Included in its collections are more than 800 volumes of church and cemetery records for Lehigh and neighboring counties, early county records (tax rolls, wills and land deeds), indexed marriage records and announcements, 800 volumes of family genealogical histories, city directories (1860 onwards), maps, census records and published histories.  The library also maintains microfiche versions of several of Allentown's early German and English-language newspapers.  Access to the library is free for Society members; a small fee applies for non-members.

Historic sites 

The Lehigh County Historical Society administers several historical sites in the region:

 Claussville One-Room Schoolhouse (1893) – This brick One-room schoolhouse was the last in Lehigh County. 2917 Route 100, north of Fogelsville
 Haines Mill Museum (ca. 1850, rebuilt 1909) – Working grist mill. 3600 Dorney Park Road, Cetronia, South Whitehall Township
 Lockridge Furnace Museum (1868) – 19th century ironworks, now a museum and park dedicated to the anthracite iron industry. 525 Franklin Street, Alburtis
Saylor Cement Industry Museum (1893) – Cement kilns built by David O. Saylor, father of the American Portland cement industry. North Second Street, Coplay
 Trout Hall (1770) – Colonial stone mansion.  Home of James Allen, son of Allentown's founder, William Allen. 4th & Walnut Streets, Allentown
 Troxell-Steckel Farm Museum (1756) – Pennsylvania Dutch stone farmhouse, one of Lehigh County's oldest structures.  4229 Reliance Street, off Route 329, Village of Egypt, Whitehall Township

Publications 

Proceedings, the journal of the Lehigh County Historical Society, was published on a bi-annual basis since 1906 and featured articles focusing on local and regional history. From 1947 to 1994, the publication was bound in a distinctive blue buckram hardcover binding with gilt lettering. In 1994, the journal was published in softcover.  Publication of Proceedings was discontinued in 2004.

See also 
 Allentown, Pennsylvania
 Lehigh County, Pennsylvania
 List of historic places in Allentown, Pennsylvania
 List of historical societies
 Mahlon Hellerich

References

External links 

 Official Web Site.
 Google Map location for the museum.

1904 establishments in Pennsylvania
Historical societies in Pennsylvania
History museums in Pennsylvania
History of Allentown, Pennsylvania
Museums in Allentown, Pennsylvania
Organizations based in Allentown, Pennsylvania